The Agricultural Mortgage Corporation Plc (AMC) was formed in 1928 under the Agricultural Credits Act, to provide long term mortgages for land and redeveloping farming and rural-based businesses. Initially jointly owned by the Bank of England and the main clearing banks, it was purchased outright by Lloyds Bank in 1993 and is currently a wholly owned subsidiary of Lloyds Banking Group.

History
Following the first world war, there was a crisis in farming, with too few people owning land. The Government identified a need for long term finance in the agricultural industry to satisfy an investment demand. AMC was created to revitalise land ownership to get a new generation of farmers onto their own land and farming to feed the nation.

Prior to 1991, AMC's activities were constrained by statute. In 1993, Lloyds Bank acquired the balance of the share capital from the Bank of England, Barclays Bank, Midland Bank, National Westminster Bank and the Royal Bank of Scotland. As a condition of the sale, it continues to run the organisation as an independent company under its own name.

See also

Lloyds Development Capital
ACC Loan Management

References

External links

 

Lloyds Banking Group
Agricultural organisations based in the United Kingdom
Banks established in 1928
Andover, Hampshire